Teruaki Masumoto (増元照明, b. October 5, 1955 in Kagoshima Prefecture -)  is the secretary general of the Japanese Association of the Families of Victims Kidnapped by North Korea, which advocates for the return of Japanese citizens kidnapped by North Korea and calls for the Japanese government to impose sanctions on the country. His older sister Rumiko is one of the victims.  On February 1, 2007, he married actress Yuuko Wakamiya. in May 2012 he  testified at North Korean human rights in European Parliament about his sister and other abductees including Megumi Yokota and Yaeko Taguchi

See also 
 North Korean abductions of Japanese
 Abduction: The Megumi Yokota Story

External links 
 Teruaki Masumoto official page (in Japanese)
 "N. Korea kidnap victims want 'hostile' diplomats removed", Asian Political News, June 2, 2003.

1955 births
Living people
Party for Japanese Kokoro politicians
21st-century Japanese politicians
People from Kagoshima
Hokkaido University alumni
North Korean abductions of Japanese citizens
Japanese human rights activists